Microbacterium xylanilyticum is a Gram-positive, non-spore-forming, xylan-degrading and non-motile bacterium from the genus Microbacterium which has been isolated from sludge in Cheongju in Korea.

References

Further reading 
 

Bacteria described in 2005
xylanilyticum